Ruyterwacht is a northern suburb of Cape Town, South Africa, bordering the industrial area of Epping and the formerly Cape Coloured neighborhood of Elsie's River as well as the GrandWest Casino.

Eppingtuin ("Epping Garden"), as Ruyterwacht was once known, began as a subsidized housing project for underprivileged white South Africans. In its early years as an independent township, it was administered by the Urban Housing Bureau under the Cape Town Divisional Council. Ons gemeentelike feesalbum (1951) includes an article on the Eppingtuin Reformed Church on the neighborhood's founding: "On September 7, 1938, the Centenary Year [of the Great Trek] seventy families descended from Voortrekkers moved in among the luxuriant pines and crawling wildlife. Descended from sturdy Afrikaner stock, they swelled to several hundred in a matter of months."

The church hall of the mother congregation in Ruyterwacht is named after Zerilda Steyn, chairwoman of the Urban Housing Association from 1945 to her death in 1963.

Sources 
 Olivier, Rev. P.L. (compiler) (1952). Ons gemeentelike feesalbum. Cape Town/Pretoria: N.G. Kerk-uitgewers.
 Potgieter, D.J. (ed.) (1972). Standard Encyclopaedia of Southern Africa. Cape Town: Nasionale Opvoedkundige Uitgewery (Nasou).

References 

Suburbs of Cape Town